Kauhava Airfield is an airfield located in Kauhava, Finland,  north of Kauhava town centre.

The airfield used to be a military airport until the end of 2014, owned and operated by Finavia. Training Air Wing of the Finnish Air Force was based at the airport.  In May 2014, Finavia announced that it would sell the airport properties to Kasvuyrittäjät Oy.

See also 
List of the largest airports in the Nordic countries

References

External links 
 
 AIP Finland – Kauhava Airport
 
 

Airports in Finland
Airport
Finnish Air Force bases
Buildings and structures in South Ostrobothnia